Jacob Wiley (born September 4, 1994) is an American-born naturalized Macedonian professional basketball player for Vaqueros de Bayamón of the Baloncesto Superior Nacional (BSN) in Puerto Rico.

College career
Wiley played college basketball for the Montana Grizzlies, Lewis–Clark State Warriors, and Eastern Washington Eagles. He primarily plays the forward position. During his first and only year at Montana, he averaged a very discouraging 1.0 point and 3.0 minutes per game with Montana, including tying a team-high 5 points in a blowout 81–34 2013 NCAA tournament loss to Syracuse. He also participated in their track team after their NCAA Tournament season was over with before leaving Montana after his first basketball practice as a sophomore, to the point where he stopped playing the sport altogether from October 2013 to March 2014. After that point, he started over his basketball career, transferring to Lewis–Clark State in the NAIA. His first year at Lewis–Clark led to Wiley earning All-Conference honors and was named an All-American honorable mention there. During his junior year at Lewis–Clark, he was named a First-Team NAIA All-American and helped the program win its first ever NAIA Tournament Championship. After that, he transferred to Eastern Washington to try and earn a master's degree while also playing basketball. In 2016–17, during his only year at Eastern Washington, Wiley was named the Big Sky Conference Player of the Year after averaging 20.2 points, 9.2 rebounds, 2.8 blocks, and 2.3 assists per game for the Eagles.

Professional career

Brooklyn Nets / Long Island Nets (2017–2018)
After going undrafted in the 2017 NBA draft, Wiley played with the Brooklyn Nets during the 2017 NBA Summer League. He later signed a two-way contract with the Nets on August 14, 2017. Under the terms of the deal, he would split time with Brooklyn and their NBA G League affiliate, the Long Island Nets. He made his NBA debut on October 29, 2017, playing four minutes and recording two rebounds in a 124–111 loss over the Denver Nuggets. On January 15, 2018, he was waived by the Nets. In five games with Brooklyn, Wiley recorded averages of 0.8 points, 2.2 rebounds and 0.4 assists in 6.7 minutes per game. He also appeared in 16 games with Long Island, averaging 7.8 points, 3.6 rebounds and 1.1 assists in 20.6 minutes per contest.

MHP Riesen Ludwigsburg (2018)
On March 4, 2018, Wiley signed with MHP Riesen Ludwigsburg of the Basketball Bundesliga.

Adelaide 36ers (2018–2019)
On August 1, 2018, after playing with the Dallas Mavericks during the 2018 NBA Summer League, Wiley signed with the Adelaide 36ers for the 2018–19 NBL season.

After initially re-signing with Adelaide for another season, Wiley exercised his European out-clause in June 2019.

Gran Canaria (2019)
On February 20, 2019, Wiley signed with Spanish team Gran Canaria.

Panathinaikos (2019–2020)
On July 16, 2019, Wiley signed a one-year contract with Greek Basket League champions Panathinaikos.

Gran Canaria and Basket Zaragoza (2020–2021)
On July 14, 2020, Gran Canaria matched an offer made by Joventut Badalona, thus bringing back Wiley under the "tanteo" rules of the Spanish league. On February 26, 2021, Wiley went on loan to Basket Zaragoza.

Budućnost (2021–2022)
On July 3, 2021, Wiley signed with Budućnost VOLI of the ABA League. He was suspended by the team on December 3, after failing to come to practice and leaving Podgorica without the team’s consent due to a family issue.

Real Betis (2022)
On February 4, 2022, Wiley signed with Real Betis of the Liga ACB.

National team career
On November 12, 2020, Wiley received a North Macedonian passport and became eligible to play for the North Macedonian national team. On November 15, 2020, he was included in the preliminary squad for the EuroBasket 2021 qualifiers against Italy and Estonia.

Career statistics

NBA

|-
| style="text-align:left;"| 
| style="text-align:left;"| Brooklyn
| 5 || 0 || 6.6 || .250 || .500 || .500 || 2.2 || .4 || .2 || .0 || .8
|- class="sortbottom"
| style="text-align:center;" colspan="2"| Career
| 5 || 0 || 6.6 || .250 || .500 || .500 || 2.2 || .4 || .2 || .0 || .8

EuroLeague

|-
| style="text-align:left;"| 2018–19
| style="text-align:left;" rowspan=1| Gran Canaria
| 7 || 3 || 21.3 || .633 || .000 || .800 || .6 || 2.6 || .9 || .3 || 10.0 || 9.1
|- class="sortbottom"
| style="text-align:left;"| Career
| style="text-align:left;"|
| 7 || 3 || 21.3 || .633 || .000 || .800 || .6 || 2.6 || .9 || .3 || 10.0 || 9.1

References

External links
Eastern Washington Eagles bio
A path of life and death: Jake Wiley quit, then conquered, now aims for NBA draft

1994 births
Living people
Adelaide 36ers players
American expatriate basketball people in Australia
American expatriate basketball people in Germany
American expatriate basketball people in Spain
American men's basketball players
Basketball players from Washington (state)
Brooklyn Nets players
CB Gran Canaria players
Centers (basketball)
Eastern Washington Eagles men's basketball players
Lewis–Clark State Warriors men's basketball players
Liga ACB players
Long Island Nets players
Macedonian expatriate basketball people in Spain
Macedonian men's basketball players
Montana Grizzlies basketball players
Panathinaikos B.C. players
People from Pend Oreille County, Washington
Power forwards (basketball)
Riesen Ludwigsburg players
Undrafted National Basketball Association players
Shiga Lakes players
American emigrants to North Macedonia
American expatriate basketball people in Japan
American expatriate basketball people in Montenegro
Macedonian expatriate sportspeople in Montenegro
Macedonian expatriate sportspeople in Japan